Joseph Mamadee Woah-Tee (16 August 1948 - 31 May 2009) was a Liberian politician and member of the Labor Party of Liberia (LPL). A native of Bong County, he founded the Woah-Tee Progressive Movement.

Early life
Woah-Tee was born on August 16, 1949, in Gbaomu, Bong County. He earned a bachelor of science degree from the University of Liberia as well as two master's degrees in the United States from Morgan State University. Woah-Tee earned his Ph.D from the University of Maryland, College Park.

Politics
Running as the LPL presidential candidate in the 11 October 2005 elections, Woah-Tee placed 14th out of 22 candidates, receiving 0.6% of the vote.  He is the founder of the Woah-Tee Progressive Movement.

Death
Joseph Woah-Tee was murdered on May 31, 2009, during a robbery attempt in Baltimore, Maryland. He ran an event hall called the Gaimei Nangbn Woah-Tee Multi-Purpose Neighborhood Center in the 4300 block of York Road. A party had just let out when a man walked into the office and demanded money from Woah-Tee. A struggle ensued and Woah-Tee was shot in the chest and died.

References

1948 births
Living people
University of Maryland, College Park alumni
University of Liberia alumni
Morgan State University alumni
People from Bong County
Candidates for President of Liberia
Labor Party of Liberia politicians
Liberian expatriates in the United States
Liberian people murdered abroad
People murdered in Baltimore
Deaths by firearm in Maryland